Opsaridium splendens is a species of ray-finned fish in the family Cyprinidae found in Burundi and Tanzania. Its natural habitat is rivers.
It is threatened by habitat loss.

References

Opsaridium
Fish described in 1997
Freshwater fish of Africa
Taxonomy articles created by Polbot